Four naval vessels of the Soviet Union have been named Zheleznyakov, after Anatoli Zhelezniakov:

 , a river monitor.

Russian Navy ship names